Aria Barzegar or Seyed Aria Barzegar (born 10 October 2002) is an Iranian professional footballer who plays as a forward for Naft Masjed Soleyman in the Persian Gulf Pro League.

Club career

Persepolis
In October 2019, he signed a three-year contract with the club. He continued to play in the youth team. In 2020, he was on bench in 2020 AFC Champions League Final with number 25.

Fajr Sepasi (loan)
In March 2021, he went on loan to Fajr Sepasi from the Azadegan League. He made his debut for the club on 24 April 2021 in a match against Pars Jonoubi. At the end of the 2020–2021 season, he became the winner of the championship. In August 2021, he left the club.

Vitebsk
In March 2022, he moved to the Belarusian club Vitebsk. He made his debut for the club on 7 April 2022, in the Belarusian Cup against Gomel. He made his debut in the Premier League on 11 April 2022, in a match against Arsenal Dzerzhinsky. In July 2022, information appeared that the footballer would leave the club during the summer transfer window. On 17 July 2022, the club announced the termination of the contract with the player by agreement of the parties.

Naft MIS
In July 2022, he moved to the Iranian club Tractor. Then he soon became a player in the Naft MIS club. He made his debut for Naft Masjed Soleyman in Persian Gulf Pro League on 25 August 2022, appearing off the bench against Paykan in 3rd week of 2022–23 Persian Gulf Pro League.

International career
Barzegar made his debut for the Iran national team in 2022 at aged 21 in a 1–0 friendly win over Nicaragua on 10 November 2022.

Honours
Persepolis
 Persian Gulf Pro League : 2019–2020
 AFC Champions League Runner-up : 2020

Fajr Sepasi
 Azadegan League : 2020–21

Iran U19
 CAFA Junior Championship 2019

References

External links
 
 
 Profile at TeamMelli.com
 
 

2002 births
Living people
People from Shiraz
Iranian footballers
Association football forwards
Iran international footballers
Iran youth international footballers
Persepolis F.C. players
Fajr Sepasi players
Persian Gulf Pro League players
Iranian expatriate footballers
Expatriate footballers in Belarus
FC Vitebsk players
Naft Masjed Soleyman F.C. players
Azadegan League players